The Destroyer Tour also known as The Spirit of '76 Tour was a concert tour by Kiss, in support of their fourth studio album Destroyer.

History 
The August 20 Anaheim, California show was the most famous show of the tour, the band played to over 42,000 people, the biggest US crowd the band had played to. Bob Seger, Ted Nugent and Montrose were the opening acts. The J. Geils Band, Point Blank and Seger opened for them at their July 10 show in New Jersey, which was recorded and released on DVD decades later as "The Lost Concert".

Opening act Bob Seger would back out of a few dates on the tour so that he could complete work on his next album, in which he did not perform in Toronto.

In the tour program for the band's final tour, Simmons reflected on the tour:

Setlist 
"Detroit Rock City"
"King Of The Night Time World"
"Let Me Go, Rock 'n' Roll"
"Strutter"
"Hotter Than Hell"
"Cold Gin" (Ace Frehley guitar solo)
"Nothin' to Lose"
"Shout It Out Loud"
"Do You Love Me?"
"God of Thunder" (Gene Simmons bloodspitting and bass solo, Peter Criss drum solo)
"Rock and Roll All Nite" (Paul Stanley destroys guitar after the song)

Encore
"Deuce"
"Firehouse" (Gene breathes fire)
"Black Diamond"

"Flaming Youth" and "Watchin' You" played in some shows instead of "Strutter" and "Let Me Go, Rock 'n' Roll".
"Sweet Pain" was performed once in Norfolk on July 3, 1976.

Tour dates

Box office score data

Personnel
Paul Stanley – vocals, rhythm guitar
Gene Simmons – vocals, bass
Peter Criss – drums, vocals
Ace Frehley – lead guitar, backing vocals

References

Bibliography

Kiss (band) concert tours
1976 concert tours